This is a list of episodes of the PBS Kids television show SciGirls.

Series overview

Episodes

Season 1 (2010)

Season 2 (2012) 
This is the last season to air while Soup2Nuts was still active.

Season 3 (2015) 
This marks the first season to air after Soup2Nuts' closure, despite being still listed in the credits this season.

Season 4 (2018) 
NOTE: Jake is absent for this season.

Season 5 (2019–20)

Season 6 (2023) 
This season is titled "SciGirls in Space" and is listed as specials on TPT's website.

NOTE: Jake is absent for this season.

References

External links 
 Official Website on PBSkids.org

Lists of non-fiction television series episodes
SciGirls episodes list of